Spoon beak may refer to:
Northern shoveler
Spoonbill

Animal common name disambiguation pages